Sivaramakrishnan Somasegar is an Indian-American technology business executive in the Greater Seattle Area. He is a Managing Director at Madrona Venture Group, a venture capital firm based in Seattle. Somasegar joined Madrona in November 2015 after a 27-year career at Microsoft, where he most recently was corporate vice president of the developer division and overseeing the global distributed R&D centers at Microsoft.

Early life 
Somasegar was born in August 1966 and grew up in Pondicherry, India with his parents and a sibling.

Somasegar attended Petit Seminaire Higher Secondary School in Pondicherry. In 1986 he received a bachelor's degree in Electronics and Communication Engineering from Guindy Engineering College, Anna University in Chennai, India. Soma then moved to the US where he received a master's degree in Computer Engineering from Louisiana State University in 1988. He was working toward a PhD in Computer Engineering from the State University of New York at Buffalo when he joined Microsoft in January 1989.

Career

Microsoft 
Somasegar joined Microsoft Corporation in January 1989 as a software design engineer and had a career spanning almost 27 years as he rose through the ranks to be a senior vice president.

Somasegar joined the Operating System group at Microsoft, working on OS/2, the early versions of NT and Windows – in all eight different releases of the Windows family of product.

As the leader of developer division, Somasegar was responsible for engineering, marketing and evangelizing developer tools and services, programming languages and runtimes designed for a broad base of software developers and development teams, including the Visual Studio family of products, .NET Framework, and Team Foundation Server. His team was also responsible for MSDN and TechNet online properties to enable a deep connection with the developer and IT professional audiences. In addition, Somasegar was the founder of Microsoft's India R&D efforts, and the executive sponsor for Microsoft's global development centers including the R&D efforts in China, India and Israel.

Under Somasegar's leadership, the Microsoft Developer Division, which supports over six million .NET developers worldwide, expanded its mission to deliver developer tools and services for mobile development and cloud development across a variety of platforms and programming technologies through the Visual Studio and .NET family of products.

Madrona Venture Group 
Somasegar joined Madrona Venture Group in November 2015, a venture capital firm based in Seattle, investing primarily in early-stage Pacific Northwest technology companies. As a managing director at Madrona, Somasegar focuses on investment areas including machine learning/artificial intelligence, multi-sense user interfaces, next generation cloud infrastructure, intelligent applications, and robotic process automation (RPA). Somasegar has authored several articles outlining Madrona's perspective on how these technologies will evolve.

Notable investments include Snowflake and UiPath.

Personal life 
Somasegar lives in the Seattle area with his wife Akila, and their two daughters.

In August 2019, Somasegar and Akila joined the ownership group of Seattle Sounders FC, a Major League Soccer club.

Awards 
Somasegar received an honorary doctorate from his alma mater, Anna University (November 2006).

Somasegar was presented with the Asian American Engineer of the Year Award from the Chinese Institute of Engineers USA (CIE-USA) (February 2008).

References

External links 

American business executives
Microsoft employees
Living people
People from Pondicherry
1966 births
College of Engineering, Guindy alumni
American people of Indian descent
Businesspeople from Puducherry